Packsaddle Grove is a medium-sized sequoia grove on Giant Sequoia National Monument located in the South Creek of the Kern River watershed. It is a fairly wet grove as it straddles Packsaddle Creek and its tributaries.

This compact grove offers a rare look at a truly old growth forest where California condors have lived, and may once again do. 
The main access to this grove is via dirt roads and cross-country hiking. The terrain is steep, so it's a difficult hike. You can only visit this grove in the summer when the roads are open. The main option for seeing the grove itself is to hike cross-country through it.

This grove was heavily impacted by the Windy Fire in 2021, with over a third of the grove burning at high severity.

Noteworthy trees
 Packsaddle Giant, which was killed in the Windy Fire.
 Ghost Tree (sometimes referred to as General Lee Tree, of which however exist several in different groves), a once much larger tree with a heavily broken top, but growing a new top shoot (leader). It was heavily damaged in the Windy Fire.

See also
List of giant sequoia groves

References

 http://www.fs.fed.us/r5/sequoia/recreation/giant_sequoia_groves.html#packsaddle

Giant sequoia groves
Protected areas of Tulare County, California
Sequoia National Forest